Franz Ignaz Danzi (15 June 1763 – 13 April 1826) was a German cellist, composer and conductor, the son of the Italian cellist Innocenz Danzi (1730–1798) and brother of the noted singer Franzeska Danzi. Danzi lived at a significant time in the history of European music. His career, spanning the transition from the late Classical to the early Romantic styles, coincided with the origin of much of the music that lives in our concert halls and is familiar to contemporary classical-music audiences. As a young man he knew Wolfgang Amadeus Mozart, whom he revered; he was a contemporary of Ludwig van Beethoven, about whom he — like many of his generation — had strong but mixed feelings; and he was a mentor for the young Carl Maria von Weber, whose music he respected and promoted.

Life and career

Born in Schwetzingen and raised in Mannheim, Danzi studied with his father and with Georg Joseph Vogler before he joined the superlative orchestra of the Elector Karl Theodor in 1778 as a teenager. 

In 1780, the first of his woodwind compositions was published at Mannheim. His father, principal cellist of the orchestra, was praised by Mozart for his playing at the premiere of Idomeneo. Danzi remained behind in a Mannheim that was rendered more provincial when Karl Theodor moved his court to Munich in 1778. After an apprenticeship with the small theatre orchestra left in Mannheim, he rejoined the main court in Munich as principal cellist — taking his father's position — in 1784.

In 1790, he married the singer and composer Maria Margarethe Marchand, with whom he travelled in an opera troupe to Leipzig, Prague, Venice, and Florence.

By 1798, once more in Munich, he rose to the position of assistant Kapellmeister in one of the most important musical centers of Europe, but in 1807, unhappy at the treatment he received at court and despairing of any further advancement, he left Munich to be Kapellmeister in the smaller and less important Stuttgart court of the new king of Württemberg, Frederick I. 

After five years he moved again to Karlsruhe, where he spent the last years of his life at the Royal Konservatorium struggling to raise the modest courtly musical establishment to respectability.

He died in Karlsruhe, aged 62.

Contribution
Danzi is known today chiefly for his woodwind quintets, in which he took justifiable pride for the idiomatic treatment of the individual instruments. He composed in most major genres of the time, including opera, church music, orchestral works, and many varieties of chamber music. He was a first-rate cellist as well as a conscientious and — by all reports — effective orchestra leader and conductor.

At Schwetzingen, the city concert hall was renamed in his honour in 2005.

Family
Francesca Lebrun (1756–91), a singer and composer, was Franz Danzi's sister.

Selected works

Among his compositions are:
 Symphonie Concertante in E major for Wind Quintet and Orchestra (1785)
 3 String Quartets, Op. 5
 6 String Quartets, Op. 6
 3 Duos for viola and cello (book 1)
 3 Duos for viola and cello, Op. 9 (book 2)
 Wind Sextet in E major, Op. 10
 Septet in E major, Op. 10 (arrangement of Sextet, Op. 10)
 Septet in E major, Op. 15
 Sinfonia in C major for Orchestra, Op. 25 (Danzi wrote 8 Sinfonias)
 Horn Sonata in E major, Op. 28 (c.1804)
 3 String Quartets, Op. 29
 Flute Concerto No. 1 in G major, Op. 30
 Flute Concerto No. 2 in D minor, Op. 31
 3 Quartets for Bassoon and Strings, Op. 40
 Quintet in D minor for Piano and Winds, Op. 41
 Symphonie Concertante in B major for Flute, Clarinet and Orchestra, Op. 41
 Flute Concerto No. 3 in D minor, Op. 42
 Flute Concerto No. 4 in D major, Op. 43
 Sonata concertante in E minor for Horn and Piano, Op. 44
 3 Potpourris for Clarinet and Orchestra, Op. 45 (1814)
 Concertino, for Clarinet, Solo Bassoon and Chamber Band, Op. 47
 Quintet in F major for Piano and Winds, Op. 53
 Quintet in D major for Piano and Winds, Op. 54
 3 Wind Quintets, Op. 56
 6 String Quintets (with 2 violas), Op. 66
 3 Wind Quintets, Op. 67
 3 Wind Quintets, Op. 68
 3 Trios for Flute and Strings, Op. 71
 4 Bassoon Concertos
 Cello Concerto in A major
 Cello Concerto in E minor
 Horn Concerto in E major
 Ouvertüre in E major for Orchestra
 Piano Concerto in E major
 Sonata in D major for 2 Organs
 Sonatina in D major for Flute and Piano
 Sonata for Clarinet and Piano in B major "Sonata Concertante"  
 Sinfonia Concertante in E major for Flute, Oboe, Horn, Bassoon and Orchestra
 6 Pieces Faciles for Piano, Op. 73
 4 Arias from Operas by Mozart (arranged by Danzi for 2 cellos)

External links 

 Composer biography at Naxos website 
 
 A substantial list of newly-published editions of Danzi's works in Russian Wikipedia
 Article on the 9 Danzi Wind Quintets at the Double Reed Society website
 

1763 births
1826 deaths
18th-century classical composers
18th-century German people
19th-century classical composers
German Classical-period composers
German classical cellists
German conductors (music)
German male conductors (music)
German expatriates in the Czech lands
German expatriates in Italy
German people of Italian descent
People from Schwetzingen
Pupils of Georg Joseph Vogler
German Romantic composers
German male classical composers
19th-century German composers
18th-century German composers
18th-century German male musicians
19th-century German male musicians
20th-century cellists